John Alexander Wallace (April 3, 1881 – October 13, 1961) was a Canadian politician, engineer and farmer.

Wallace was born in Simcoe, Ontario, Canada. He was elected in 1921 to the House of Commons of Canada as a Member of the Progressive Party in the riding of Norfolk. He was previously defeated in the 1917 election as a Member of Laurier's Liberals and in 1945 as a Member of the Co-operative Commonwealth Federation.

External links

References 

1881 births
1961 deaths
Members of the House of Commons of Canada from Ontario
Progressive Party of Canada MPs
People from Norfolk County, Ontario
Candidates in the 1917 Canadian federal election
Liberal Party of Canada candidates for the Canadian House of Commons
Co-operative Commonwealth Federation candidates for the Canadian House of Commons